Thomas Anderson Brosseau is an American musical storyteller and guitarist, born and raised in Grand Forks, North Dakota, United States. He was awarded Key to the City of Grand Forks by mayor Michael R. Brown in 2007, in part due to his original album of music, Grand Forks, which was dedicated to the people along the Red River of the North who lived through the 1997 Red River flood.

Early life
Brosseau learned to play acoustic guitar from his grandmother. As Brosseau explains: "I grew up with music in the church, in the school, music at home. I learned a lot of hymnal and folk songs, both traditional and contemporary, and since I was influenced by what my grandparents listened to, in a sense I studied the singers and songwriters of the Great American Songbook.”

Career
Brosseau moved to Los Angeles in 2003, and began performing at the renowned club Largo, where he met Sara and Sean Watkins. Sean Watkins recorded both Brosseau's albums North Dakota Impressions (2016) and Grass Punks (2014), which included the song "We Were Meant To Be Together" and was later featured in the original Netflix series Love. John Parish produced Perfect Abandon (2015) with Brosseau and a 3-piece band at The Cube theater in Bristol UK, using only a single mic.

Brosseau has toured in Japan, Canada, Portugal, Iceland, and Australia. He also sings and plays guitar with Becky Stark, Sebastian Steinberg, and John C. Reilly in John Reilly & Friends. In 2011, they released the Jack White-produced Blue Series 7" singles John & Tom (TMR-112) and Becky & John (TMR-113) on Third Man Records.

Brosseau's compositions have been covered by many artists. Notably, his song "How to Grow a Woman from the Ground" was covered by Chris Thile, who released a 2006 album of the same name. Experimental folk pop duo Christy & Emily covered "Here Comes The Water Now" in 2010, a song originally featured on Grand Forks, and also in 2010 the band Mice Parade covered his song "Mary Anne" on their album What It Means To Be Left Handed.

Collaborations
Brosseau's musical collaborations include a folk duo with singer-songwriter Gregory Page called The American Folksingers, which began in San Diego, California in 2002. The American Folksingers released two volumes of American folk music on Page's Bed Pan Records for which Lou Curtiss was musical advisor. Les Shelleys, Brosseau's folk duo with Yuba City, California native singer-songwriter Angela Correa, also began in San Diego, California in the early 2000s. They released one album on FatCat Records in 2010, Les Shelleys, and toured extensively in the U.S., U.K., and Europe. Brosseau is often part of the Watkins Family Hour, headed by sister and brother, Sean and Sara Watkins, in Los Angeles, California.

The North Dakota Trilogy
Brosseau's three Crossbill Records releases North Dakota Impressions (2016), Perfect Abandon (2015), and Grass Punks (2014) are a trilogy, informally known as the North Dakota Trilogy. As Brosseau explains: "The trilogy visits life from a local perspective, taking the listener on a journey that doesn't clip along uniformly on some common interstate, but treads at its own pace on a rural route. More glances, more investigations and introspections, more light, more dark. Memories, imaginings, longings for a place, a home. My sense of home is probably the dearest thing I hold. I work to preserve it. I go back into my memories and dreams of where I grew up and I explore, not as a detective but a cartographer. Noting each item and each room I am able to keep everything alive, and when everything is alive it is glorious. So daily I roam through any place or structure I've ever been. I visit with people that have long since been dead. I sit in a park with my favorite weather."

Discography
Tom Brosseau (2001)
North Dakota (2002) 
Late Night at Largo (2004) 
What I Mean To Say Is Goodbye (2005) 
Empty Houses Are Lonely (2006)
Grand Forks (2007) 
Cavalier (2007)
Posthumous Success (2009)
Les Shelleys (2010)
John & Tom (2011)
Grass Punks (2014)
Perfect Abandon (2015)
North Dakota Impressions (2016)
Treasures Untold (2017)
In The Shadow Of The Hill: Songs from the Carter Family catalogue, Vol. 1 (2019)
A Lifetime Ago: Rarities 2002 - 2019 (2020)
Live in York (2020)
The Prairie  (2020)

References

External links

Mary Jones Management
Crossbill Records

Year of birth missing (living people)
Living people
American folk singers
American male singer-songwriters
People from Grand Forks, North Dakota
21st-century American male singers
21st-century American singers
Singer-songwriters from North Dakota
FatCat Records artists